Isaac David Christie-Davies (born 18 October 1997) is a professional footballer who plays as a midfielder for Belgian Pro League club Eupen. Born in England, he has represented both England and Wales at youth international level.

Career

Liverpool
Christie-Davies made his professional debut for Liverpool on 17 December 2019, starting in the away match against Aston Villa in the quarter-finals of the EFL Cup. He was loaned out for the second half of the 2019–2020 season at Belgian side Cercle Brugge and scored in his first appearance, a friendly against FC Augsburg. He was released by Liverpool at the end of the 2019–20 season.

Barnsley
Christie-Davies signed a three-year contract with Barnsley on 7 September 2020. On 29 January 2021, he joined Slovak Super Liga side Dunajská Streda on loan until the end of the season.

On 8 June 2022, Christie-Davies joined Belgian First Division A side Eupen on a free transfer, signing a two-year deal.

Career statistics

Club

References

External links
 
 
 
 

1997 births
Living people
Footballers from Brighton
Welsh footballers
Welsh expatriate footballers
Wales under-21 international footballers
English footballers
England youth international footballers
English people of Welsh descent
Association football midfielders
Liverpool F.C. players
Cercle Brugge K.S.V. players
Barnsley F.C. players
FC DAC 1904 Dunajská Streda players
K.A.S. Eupen players
Slovak Super Liga players
English Football League players
Belgian Pro League players
Expatriate footballers in Belgium
Welsh expatriate sportspeople in Belgium
Expatriate footballers in Slovakia
Welsh expatriate sportspeople in Slovakia